The Open Education Resource Foundation is a New Zealand open educational organisation that supports the following projects:
Open Educational Resource university (OERu)
WikiEducator (MediaWiki based online courses)

See also
Open educational resources
William and Flora Hewlett Foundation

References

External links
https://oeru.org
http://wikieducator.org

Educational organisations based in New Zealand
Distance education institutions based in New Zealand
Education International
Open educational resources